Rebecca Burns may refer to:
 Rebecca Burns (cricketer) (born 1994), New Zealand cricketer
 Rebecca Burns (journalist), American journalist, professor and author